Khristo Shopov (born 12 January 1912, date of death unknown) was a Bulgarian sports shooter. He competed in the trap event at the 1952 Summer Olympics.

References

1912 births
Year of death missing
Bulgarian male sport shooters
Olympic shooters of Bulgaria
Shooters at the 1952 Summer Olympics
Place of birth missing